Cape Bystrov is a headland located on the north-west part of Jackson Island, Russia. The cape is named in honour of Alexey Bystrov, who was a Russian paleontologist.

References
Map of Jackson Island (in Russian). Red arrow indicates the position of Cape Bystrov.

Bystrov